The breakdown of the result of the 2011 Tunisian Constituent Assembly election is as follows:

Overall

Vote and seat summaries

By constituency

Summary

Greater Tunis

|- style="background:#E9E9E9;"
! colspan="2" align="left" | Parties
! Votes
! %
! Seats
|-
| bgcolor="" |
| align="left" | Ennahda Movement || 71,170 || 35.39 || 3
|-
| bgcolor="" |
| align="left" | Democratic Forum for Labour and Liberties || 27,570 || 13.71 || 1
|-
| bgcolor="" |
| align="left" | Congress for the Republic (CPR) || 17,791 || 8.85 || 1
|-
| bgcolor="" |
| align="left" | Progressive Democratic Party || 13,791 || 6.86 || 1
|-
| bgcolor="" |
| align="left" | Democratic Modernist Pole || 9,869 || 4.91 || 1
|-
| bgcolor="" |
| align="left" | Maghrebin Liberal Party || 6,621 || 3.29 || 1
|- style="background:#E9E9E9;"
! colspan="2" align="left" | Total !! 201,074 !! 100.00 !! 8
|-
| colspan="5" | Source: ISIE.tn
|}

|- style="background:#E9E9E9;"
! colspan="2" align="left" | Parties
! Votes
! %
! Seats
|-
| bgcolor="" |
| align="left" | Ennahda Movement || 98,216 || 41.53 || 4
|-
| bgcolor="" |
| align="left" | Democratic Forum for Labour and Liberties || 29,819 || 12.61 || 2
|-
| bgcolor="" |
| align="left" | Congress for the Republic|| 25,674 || 10.86 || 1
|-
| bgcolor="" |
| align="left" | Progressive Democratic Party || 11,127 || 4.71 || 1
|-
| bgcolor="" |
| align="left" | Democratic Modernist Pole || 6,195 || 2.62 || 1
|-
| bgcolor="white" |
| align="left" | Social-Democratic Nation Party || 5,643 || 2.39 || 1
|- style="background:#E9E9E9;"
! colspan="2" align="left" | Total !! 236,490 !! 100.00 !! 10
|-
| colspan="5" | Source: ISIE.tn
|}

|- style="background:#E9E9E9;"
! colspan="2" align="left" | Parties
! Votes
! %
! Seats
|-
| bgcolor="" |
| align="left" | Ennahda Movement || 53,547 || 39.41 || 3
|-
| bgcolor="" |
| align="left" | Congress for the Republic || 12,286 || 9.04 || 1
|-
| bgcolor="" |
| align="left" | Democratic Forum for Labour and Liberties || 10,432 || 7.68 || 1
|-
| bgcolor="white" |
| align="left" | New Destour Party || 5,826 || 4.29 || 1
|-
| bgcolor="" |
| align="left" | Popular Petition|| 5,310 || 3.91 || 1
|- style="background:#E9E9E9;"
! colspan="2" align="left" | Total !! 135,874 !! 100.00 !! 7
|-
| colspan="5" | Source: ISIE.tn
|}

|- style="background:#E9E9E9;"
! colspan="2" align="left" | Parties
! Votes
! %
! Seats
|-
| bgcolor="" |
| align="left" | Ennahda Movement || 94,938 || 45.43 || 4
|-
| bgcolor="" |
| align="left" | Democratic Forum for Labour and Liberties || 27,179 || 13.00 || 1
|-
| bgcolor="" |
| align="left" | Congress for the Republic || 17,399 || 8.33 || 1
|-
| bgcolor="" |
| align="left" | Progressive Democratic Party || 6,971 || 3.34 || 1
|-
| bgcolor="white" |
| align="left" | Progressive Struggle Party || 5,860 || 2.80 || 1
|-
| bgcolor="" |
| align="left" | Democratic Modernist Pole|| 5,010 || 2.40 || 1
|- style="background:#E9E9E9;"
! colspan="2" align="left" | Total !! 208,995 !! 100.00 !! 9
|-
| colspan="5" | Source: ISIE.tn
|}

|- style="background:#E9E9E9;"
! colspan="2" align="left" | Parties
! Votes
! %
! Seats
|-
| bgcolor="" |
| align="left" | Ennahda Movement  || 68,131 || 29.93 || 3
|-
| bgcolor="" |
| align="left" | Democratic Forum for Labour and Liberties || 43,142 || 18.95 || 2
|-
| bgcolor="" |
| align="left" | Congress for the Republic || 24,296 || 10.67 || 1
|-
| bgcolor="" |
| align="left" | Democratic Modernist Pole || 18,709 || 8.22 || 1
|-
| bgcolor="" |
| align="left" | Progressive Democratic Party || 13,361 || 5.87 || 1
|- style="background:#E9E9E9;"
! colspan="2" align="left" | Total !! 227,647 !! 100.00 !! 8
|-
| colspan="5" | Source: ISIE.tn
|}

Cap Bon

|- style="background:#E9E9E9;"
! colspan="2" align="left" | Parties
! Votes
! %
! Seats
|-
| bgcolor="" |
| align="left" | Ennahda Movement || 53,362 || - || 2
|-
| bgcolor="" |
| align="left" | Congress for the Republic || 41,027 || - || 1
|-
| bgcolor="" |
| align="left" | Democratic Forum for Labour and Liberties || 16,533 || - || 1
|-
| bgcolor="" |
| align="left" | Popular Petition || 13,277 || - || 1
|-
| bgcolor="" |
| align="left" | Afek Tounes || 7,184 || - || 1
|-
| bgcolor="" |
| align="left" | Progressive Democratic Party || 6,364 || - || 1
|-
| bgcolor="gainsboro" |
| align="left" | Independent lists || - || - || -
|- style="background:#E9E9E9;"
! colspan="2" align="left" | Valid votes !! - !! - !! 7
|- style="background:#E9E9E9;"
| colspan="2" align="left" | Blank or invalid votes || - || -
| rowspan="4" |
|- style="background:#E9E9E9;"
! colspan="2" align="left" | Total !! - !! 100.00
|- style="background:#E9E9E9;"
| colspan="2" align="left" | Voter turnout
| colspan="2" | -
|- style="background:#E9E9E9;"
| colspan="2" align="left" | Electorate
| colspan="2" | -
|-
| colspan="5" | Source:
|}

|- style="background:#E9E9E9;"
! colspan="2" align="left" | Parties
! Votes
! %
! Seats
|-
| bgcolor="" |
| align="left" | Ennahda Movement || 36,512 || - || 2
|-
| bgcolor="" |
| align="left" | Congress for the Republic || 17,799 || - || 1
|-
| bgcolor="" |
| align="left" | Democratic Forum for Labour and Liberties || 9,766 || - || 1
|-
| bgcolor="" |
| align="left" | Popular Petition || 7,640 || - || 1
|-
| bgcolor="" |
| align="left" | Progressive Democratic Party || 5,578 || - || 1
|-
| bgcolor="gainsboro" |
| align="left" | Independent lists || - || - || -
|- style="background:#E9E9E9;"
! colspan="2" align="left" | Valid votes !! - !! - !! 6
|- style="background:#E9E9E9;"
| colspan="2" align="left" | Blank or invalid votes || - || -
| rowspan="4" |
|- style="background:#E9E9E9;"
! colspan="2" align="left" | Total !! - !! 100.00
|- style="background:#E9E9E9;"
| colspan="2" align="left" | Voter turnout
| colspan="2" | -
|- style="background:#E9E9E9;"
| colspan="2" align="left" | Electorate
| colspan="2" | -
|-
| colspan="5" | Source:
|}

Northwest

|- style="background:#E9E9E9;"
! colspan="2" align="left" | Parties
! Votes
! %
! Seats
|-
| bgcolor="" |
| align="left" | Ennahda Movement || 28,041 || - || 2
|-
| bgcolor="" |
| align="left" | Popular Petition || 8,264 || || 1
|-
| bgcolor= |
| align="left" | Progressive Democratic Party || 7,723 || - || 1
|-
| bgcolor="" |
| align="left" | Democratic Forum for Labour and Liberties || 6,870 || || 1 
|-
| bgcolor="" |
| align="left" | Congress for the Republic || 6,820 || || 1
|- style="background:#E9E9E9;"
! colspan="2" align="left" | Valid votes !! - !! - !! 6
|- style="background:#E9E9E9;"
| colspan="2" align="left" | Blank or invalid votes || - || -
| rowspan="4" |
|- style="background:#E9E9E9;"
! colspan="2" align="left" | Total !! - !! 100.00
|- style="background:#E9E9E9;"
| colspan="2" align="left" | Voter turnout
| colspan="2" | -
|- style="background:#E9E9E9;"
| colspan="2" align="left" | Electorate
| colspan="2" | -
|-
| colspan="5" | Source:
|}

|- style="background:#E9E9E9;"
! colspan="2" align="left" | Parties
! Votes
! %
! Seats
|-
| bgcolor="" |
| align="left" | Ennahda Movement || 80,576 || - || 4
|-
| bgcolor="" |
| align="left" | Congress for the Republic || 15,588 || || 1 
|-
| bgcolor="" |
| align="left" | Democratic Forum for Labour and Liberties|| 13,180 || - || 1
|-
| bgcolor="white" |
| align="left" | People's Movement || 10,353 || - || 1
|-
| bgcolor= |
| align="left" | Progressive Democratic Party || 10,285 || || 1
|-
| bgcolor="" |
| align="left" | Popular Petition || 9,987 || || 1
|- style="background:#E9E9E9;"
! colspan="2" align="left" | Valid votes !! - !! - !! 9
|- style="background:#E9E9E9;"
| colspan="2" align="left" | Blank or invalid votes || - || -
| rowspan="4" |
|- style="background:#E9E9E9;"
! colspan="2" align="left" | Total !! - !! 100.00
|- style="background:#E9E9E9;"
| colspan="2" align="left" | Voter turnout
| colspan="2" | -
|- style="background:#E9E9E9;"
| colspan="2" align="left" | Electorate
| colspan="2" | -
|-
| colspan="5" | Source:
|}

|- style="background:#E9E9E9;"
! colspan="2" align="left" | Parties
! Votes
! %
! Seats
|-
| bgcolor="" |
| align="left" | Ennahda Movement || 33,136 || - || 2
|-
| bgcolor="" |
| align="left" | Popular Petition || 12,433 || || 1
|-
| bgcolor="" |
| align="left" | Democratic Forum for Labour and Liberties || 8,627 || || 1
|-
| bgcolor= |
| align="left" | Progressive Democratic Party || 6,338 || - || 1
|-
| bgcolor="" |
| align="left" | Congress for the Republic || 5,616 || || 1 
|-
| bgcolor="gainsboro" |
| align="left" | Social Struggle (independent) || 4,749 || - || 1
|-
| bgcolor="" |
| align="left" | Democratic Patriots' Movement || 3,599 || || 1
|- style="background:#E9E9E9;"
! colspan="2" align="left" | Valid votes !! - !! - !! 8
|- style="background:#E9E9E9;"
| colspan="2" align="left" | Blank or invalid votes || - || -
| rowspan="4" |
|- style="background:#E9E9E9;"
! colspan="2" align="left" | Total !! - !! 100.00
|- style="background:#E9E9E9;"
| colspan="2" align="left" | Voter turnout
| colspan="2" | -
|- style="background:#E9E9E9;"
| colspan="2" align="left" | Electorate
| colspan="2" | -
|-
| colspan="5" | Source:
|}

|- style="background:#E9E9E9;"
! colspan="2" align="left" | Parties
! Votes
! %
! Seats
|-
| bgcolor="" |
| align="left" | Ennahda Movement || 23,015 || - || 2
|-
| bgcolor="" |
| align="left" | Popular Petition  || 6,594 || - || 1
|-
| bgcolor="gainsboro" |
| align="left" | Hope (independent) || 6,022 || - || 1
|-
| bgcolor="" |
| align="left" | Congress for the Republic || 5,346 || || 1
|-
| bgcolor="" |
| align="left" | Democratic Forum for Labour and Liberties || 4,455 || || 1
|- style="background:#E9E9E9;"
! colspan="2" align="left" | Valid votes !! - !! - !! 6
|- style="background:#E9E9E9;"
| colspan="2" align="left" | Blank or invalid votes || - || -
| rowspan="4" |
|- style="background:#E9E9E9;"
! colspan="2" align="left" | Total !! - !! 100.00
|- style="background:#E9E9E9;"
| colspan="2" align="left" | Voter turnout
| colspan="2" | -
|- style="background:#E9E9E9;"
| colspan="2" align="left" | Electorate
| colspan="2" | -
|-
| colspan="5" | Source:
|}

|- style="background:#E9E9E9;"
! colspan="2" align="left" | Parties
! Votes
! %
! Seats
|-
| bgcolor="" |
| align="left" | Ennahda Movement || 20,135 || 27.43 || 2
|-
| bgcolor="" |
| align="left" | Popular Petition || 6,229 || 8.48 || 1
|-
| bgcolor="red" |
| align="left" | Free Patriotic Union || 4,456 || 6.07 || 1
|-
| bgcolor="" |
| align="left" | Tunisian Workers' Communist Party || 3,854 || 5.25 || 1
|-
| bgcolor= |
| align="left" | Progressive Democratic Party || 3,515 || 4.78 || 1
|-
| bgcolor="gainsboro" |
| align="left" | Independent lists || - || - || -
|- style="background:#E9E9E9;"
! colspan="2" align="left" | Valid votes !! 73,414 !! - !! 6
|- style="background:#E9E9E9;"
| colspan="2" align="left" | Blank or invalid votes || - || -
| rowspan="4" |
|- style="background:#E9E9E9;"
! colspan="2" align="left" | Total !! - !! 100.00
|- style="background:#E9E9E9;"
| colspan="2" align="left" | Voter turnout
| colspan="2" | -
|- style="background:#E9E9E9;"
| colspan="2" align="left" | Electorate
| colspan="2" | -
|-
| colspan="5" | Source:
|}

Center

|- style="background:#E9E9E9;"
! colspan="2" align="left" | Parties
! Votes
! %
! Seats
|-
| bgcolor="" |
| align="left" | Ennahda Movement || 70,192 || - || 4
|-
| bgcolor="" |
| align="left" | Popular Petition || 30,084 || || 2
|-
| bgcolor="" |
| align="left" | Congress for the Republic || 7,700 || || 1 
|-
| bgcolor="" |
| align="left" | Democratic Forum for Labour and Liberties || 3,718 || - || 1
|-
| bgcolor="" |
| align="left" | Tunisian Workers' Communist Party || 2,713 || - || 1
|-
| bgcolor="gainsboro" |
| align="left" | Independent lists || - || - || -
|- style="background:#E9E9E9;"
! colspan="2" align="left" | Valid votes !! - !! - !! 9
|- style="background:#E9E9E9;"
| colspan="2" align="left" | Blank or invalid votes || - || -
| rowspan="4" |
|- style="background:#E9E9E9;"
! colspan="2" align="left" | Total !! - !! 100.00
|- style="background:#E9E9E9;"
| colspan="2" align="left" | Voter turnout
| colspan="2" | -
|- style="background:#E9E9E9;"
| colspan="2" align="left" | Electorate
| colspan="2" | -
|-
| colspan="5" | Source:
|}

|- style="background:#E9E9E9;"
! colspan="2" align="left" | Parties
! Votes
! %
! Seats
|-
| bgcolor="" |
| align="left" | Ennahda Movement || 40,971 || - || 3
|-
| bgcolor="" |
| align="left" | Popular Petition ||  ||  || 1
|-
| bgcolor="" |
| align="left" | Congress for the Republic || 8,196 || - || 1
|-
| bgcolor="white" |
| align="left" | Movement of Socialist Democrats || 5,758 || || 1
|-
| bgcolor="" |
| align="left" | Progressive Democratic Party || 5,587 || || 1
|-
| bgcolor="gainsboro" |
| align="left" | Loyalty (independent) || 5,070 || - || 1
|-
| bgcolor="" |
| align="left" | Democratic Forum for Labour and Liberties || 3,263 || || -
|- style="background:#E9E9E9;"
! colspan="2" align="left" | Valid votes !! - !! - !! 8
|- style="background:#E9E9E9;"
| colspan="2" align="left" | Blank or invalid votes || - || -
| rowspan="4" |
|- style="background:#E9E9E9;"
! colspan="2" align="left" | Total !! - !! 100.00
|- style="background:#E9E9E9;"
| colspan="2" align="left" | Voter turnout
| colspan="2" | -
|- style="background:#E9E9E9;"
| colspan="2" align="left" | Electorate
| colspan="2" | -
|-
| colspan="5" | Source:
|}

|- style="background:#E9E9E9;"
! colspan="2" align="left" | Parties
! Votes
! %
! Seats
|-
| bgcolor="" |
| align="left" | Popular Petition || 48,022 || 56.0 || 3
|-
| bgcolor="" |
| align="left" | Ennahda Movement || 19,698 || 23.0 || 2
|-
| bgcolor="gainsboro" |
| align="left" | The Independent (independent) || 11,980 || 14.0 || 1
|-
| bgcolor="white" |
| align="left" | People's Movement || 3,626 || 4.1 || 1
|-
| bgcolor="white" |
| align="left" | Movement of Socialist Democrats || 2,472 || 2.9 ||1
|-
| bgcolor="" |
| align="left" | Congress for the Republic || 2,131 || || -
|-
| bgcolor="" |
| align="left" | Democratic Patriots' Movement || 2,026 || || -
|- style="background:#E9E9E9;"
! colspan="2" align="left" | Valid votes !! 85,798 !! - !! 8
|- style="background:#E9E9E9;"
| colspan="2" align="left" | Blank or invalid votes || - || -
| rowspan="4" |
|- style="background:#E9E9E9;"
! colspan="2" align="left" | Total !! - !! 100.00
|- style="background:#E9E9E9;"
| colspan="2" align="left" | Voter turnout
| colspan="2" | -
|- style="background:#E9E9E9;"
| colspan="2" align="left" | Electorate
| colspan="2" | -
|-
| colspan="5" | Source:
|}

|- style="background:#E9E9E9;"
! colspan="2" align="left" | Parties
! Votes
! %
! Seats
|-
| bgcolor="" |
| align="left" | Ennahda Movement|| 21,285 || - || 2
|-
| bgcolor="" |
| align="left" | Popular Petition || 5,561 || - || 1
|-
| bgcolor="" |
| align="left" | Democratic Modernist Pole || 3,702 || || 1
|-
| bgcolor="" |
| align="left" | Congress for the Republic || 3,099 || || 1
|-
| bgcolor="gainsboro" |
| align="left" | Independent lists || - || - || -
|- style="background:#E9E9E9;"
! colspan="2" align="left" | Valid votes !! - !! - !! 5
|- style="background:#E9E9E9;"
| colspan="2" align="left" | Blank or invalid votes || - || -
| rowspan="4" |
|- style="background:#E9E9E9;"
! colspan="2" align="left" | Total !! - !! 100.00
|- style="background:#E9E9E9;"
| colspan="2" align="left" | Voter turnout
| colspan="2" | -
|- style="background:#E9E9E9;"
| colspan="2" align="left" | Electorate
| colspan="2" | -
|-
| colspan="5" | Source:
|}

Center-East

|- style="background:#E9E9E9;"
! colspan="2" align="left" | Parties
! Votes
! %
! Seats
|-
| bgcolor="" |
| align="left" | Ennahda Movement || 40,738 || 30.17 || 3
|-
| bgcolor="" |
| align="left" | Popular Petition || 9,707 || 7.19 || 1
|-
| bgcolor="" |
| align="left" | The Initiative || 8,881 || 6.58 || 1
|-
| bgcolor="" |
| align="left" | Congress for the Republic || 8,352 || 6.18 || 1
|-
| bgcolor="" |
| align="left" | Afek Tounes || 8,096 || 6 || 1
|-
| bgcolor="white" |
| align="left" | Equity and Equality Party || 6,098 || 4.52 || 1
|- style="background:#E9E9E9;"
! colspan="2" align="left" | Valid votes !! 135,043 !! - !! 8
|- style="background:#E9E9E9;"
| colspan="2" align="left" | Blank or invalid votes || - || -
| rowspan="4" |
|- style="background:#E9E9E9;"
! colspan="2" align="left" | Total !! - !! 100.00
|- style="background:#E9E9E9;"
| colspan="2" align="left" | Voter turnout
| colspan="2" | -
|- style="background:#E9E9E9;"
| colspan="2" align="left" | Electorate
| colspan="2" | -
|-
| colspan="5" | Source:
|}

|- style="background:#E9E9E9;"
! colspan="2" align="left" | Parties
! Votes
! %
! Seats
|-
| bgcolor="" |
| align="left" | Ennahda Movement || 65,800 || - || 3
|-
|  bgcolor="" |
| align="left" | The Initiative || 36,035 || - || 2
|-
| bgcolor="" |
| align="left" | Congress for the Republic || 8,833 || || 1
|-
| bgcolor="" |
| align="left" | Democratic Forum for Labour and Liberties || 7,862 || ||1
|-
| bgcolor="" |
| align="left" | Popular Petition || 6,736 || || 1
|-
| bgcolor="white" |
| align="left" | Cultural Unionist Nation Party || 5,219 || - || 1
|- style="background:#E9E9E9;"
! colspan="2" align="left" | Valid votes !! - !! - !! 9
|- style="background:#E9E9E9;"
| colspan="2" align="left" | Blank or invalid votes || - || -
| rowspan="4" |
|- style="background:#E9E9E9;"
! colspan="2" align="left" | Total !! - !! 100.00
|- style="background:#E9E9E9;"
| colspan="2" align="left" | Voter turnout
| colspan="2" | -
|- style="background:#E9E9E9;"
| colspan="2" align="left" | Electorate
| colspan="2" | -
|-
| colspan="5" | Source:
|}

|- style="background:#E9E9E9;"
! colspan="2" align="left" | Parties
! Votes
! %
! Seats
|-
| bgcolor="" |
| align="left" | Ennahda Movement  || 86,590 || - || 4
|-
| bgcolor="" |
| align="left" | The Initiative || 52,573 || - || 2
|-
| bgcolor="" |
| align="left" | Congress for the Republic || 12,926 || || 1
|-
| bgcolor="" |
| align="left" | Popular Petition || 12,160 || || 1
|-
| bgcolor="" |
| align="left" | Democratic Forum for Labour and Liberties || 10,051 || || 1
|-
| bgcolor="" |
| align="left" | Progressive Democratic Party || 7,519 || || 1
|-
| bgcolor="gainsboro" |
| align="left" | Independent lists || - || - || -
|- style="background:#E9E9E9;"
! colspan="2" align="left" | Valid votes !! - !! - !! 10
|- style="background:#E9E9E9;"
| colspan="2" align="left" | Blank or invalid votes || - || -
| rowspan="4" |
|- style="background:#E9E9E9;"
! colspan="2" align="left" | Total !! - !! 100.00
|- style="background:#E9E9E9;"
| colspan="2" align="left" | Voter turnout
| colspan="2" | -
|- style="background:#E9E9E9;"
| colspan="2" align="left" | Electorate
| colspan="2" | -
|-
| colspan="5" | Source:
|}

Southwest

|- style="background:#E9E9E9;"
! colspan="2" align="left" | Parties
! Votes
! %
! Seats
|-
| bgcolor="" |
| align="left" | Ennahda Movement || 48,976 || - || 3
|-
| bgcolor="" |
| align="left" | Congress for the Republic  || 9,636 || - || 1
|-
| bgcolor="" |
| align="left" | Popular Petition|| 6,545 || || 1
|-
|bgcolor="" |
| align="left" | Progressive Democratic Party || 3,170 || || 1
|-
| bgcolor="gainsboro" |
| align="left" | Justice (independent) || - || - || 1
|- style="background:#E9E9E9;"
! colspan="2" align="left" | Valid votes !! - !! - !! 7
|- style="background:#E9E9E9;"
| colspan="2" align="left" | Blank or invalid votes || - || -
| rowspan="4" |
|- style="background:#E9E9E9;"
! colspan="2" align="left" | Total !! - !! 100.00
|- style="background:#E9E9E9;"
| colspan="2" align="left" | Voter turnout
| colspan="2" | -
|- style="background:#E9E9E9;"
| colspan="2" align="left" | Electorate
| colspan="2" | -
|-
| colspan="5" | Source:
|}

|- style="background:#E9E9E9;"
! colspan="2" align="left" | Parties
! Votes
! %
! Seats
|-
| bgcolor="" |
| align="left" | Ennahda Movement || 28,041 ||  || 2
|-
| bgcolor="" |
| align="left" | Congress for the Republic || 19,456 ||  || 2
|-
| bgcolor="" |
| align="left" | Popular Petition|| 2,809 || - || 1
|- style="background:#E9E9E9;"
! colspan="2" align="left" | Valid votes !! - !! - !! 5
|- style="background:#E9E9E9;"
| colspan="2" align="left" | Blank or invalid votes || - || -
| rowspan="4" |
|- style="background:#E9E9E9;"
! colspan="2" align="left" | Total !! - !! 100.00
|- style="background:#E9E9E9;"
| colspan="2" align="left" | Voter turnout
| colspan="2" | -
|- style="background:#E9E9E9;"
| colspan="2" align="left" | Electorate
| colspan="2" | -
|-
| colspan="5" | Source:
|}

|- style="background:#E9E9E9;"
! colspan="2" align="left" | Parties
! Votes
! %
! Seats
|-
| bgcolor="" |
| align="left" | Ennahda Movement || 24,975 || - || 3
|-
| bgcolor="" |
| align="left" | Popular Petition || 2,399 || - || 1
|-
|bgcolor="" |
| align="left" | Progressive Democratic Party || 1,980 || - || -
|-
| bgcolor="gainsboro" |
| align="left" | Independent lists || - || - || -
|- style="background:#E9E9E9;"
! colspan="2" align="left" | Valid votes !! - !! - !! 4
|- style="background:#E9E9E9;"
| colspan="2" align="left" | Blank or invalid votes || - || -
| rowspan="4" |
|- style="background:#E9E9E9;"
! colspan="2" align="left" | Total !! - !! 100.00
|- style="background:#E9E9E9;"
| colspan="2" align="left" | Voter turnout
| colspan="2" | -
|- style="background:#E9E9E9;"
| colspan="2" align="left" | Electorate
| colspan="2" | -
|-
| colspan="5" | Source:
|}

|- style="background:#E9E9E9;"
! colspan="2" align="left" | Parties
! Votes
! %
! Seats
|-
| bgcolor="" |
| align="left" | Ennahda Movement  || 18,994 || - || 2
|-
| bgcolor="gainsboro" |
| align="left" | Loyalty to the Martyrs (independent) || 2,540 || - || 1
|-
| bgcolor="" |
| align="left" | Congress for the Republic || 2,217 || || 1
|-
| bgcolor="gainsboro" |
| align="left" | Independent lists || - || - || -
|- style="background:#E9E9E9;"
! colspan="2" align="left" | Valid votes !! - !! - !! 4
|- style="background:#E9E9E9;"
| colspan="2" align="left" | Blank or invalid votes || - || -
| rowspan="4" |
|- style="background:#E9E9E9;"
! colspan="2" align="left" | Total !! - !! 100.00
|- style="background:#E9E9E9;"
| colspan="2" align="left" | Voter turnout
| colspan="2" | -
|- style="background:#E9E9E9;"
| colspan="2" align="left" | Electorate
| colspan="2" | -
|-
| colspan="5" | Source:
|}

Southeast

|- style="background:#E9E9E9;"
! colspan="2" align="left" | Parties
! Votes
! %
! Seats
|-
| bgcolor="" |
| align="left" | Ennahda Movement || 73,416 || - || 4
|-
| bgcolor="" |
| align="left" | Congress for the Republic || 13,771 || - || 1
|-
| bgcolor="gainsboro" |
| align="left" | Tunisian National Front (independent) || 7,421 || - || 1
|-
| bgcolor="" |
| align="left" | Popular Petition || 7,351 || || 1 
|- style="background:#E9E9E9;"
! colspan="2" align="left" | Valid votes !! 138,175 !! - !! 7
|- style="background:#E9E9E9;"
| colspan="2" align="left" | Blank or invalid votes || - || -
| rowspan="4" |
|- style="background:#E9E9E9;"
! colspan="2" align="left" | Total !! - !! 100.00
|- style="background:#E9E9E9;"
| colspan="2" align="left" | Voter turnout
| colspan="2" | -
|- style="background:#E9E9E9;"
| colspan="2" align="left" | Electorate
| colspan="2" | -
|-
| colspan="5" | Source:
|}

|- style="background:#E9E9E9;"
! colspan="2" align="left" | Parties
! Votes
! %
! Seats
|-
| bgcolor="" |
| align="left" | Ennahda Movement || 73,316 || - || 5
|-
| bgcolor="" |
| align="left" | Congress for the Republic || 15,164 || - || 1 
|-
| bgcolor="" |
| align="left" | Afek Tounes || 8,788 || || 1
|-
| bgcolor="" |
| align="left" | Popular Petition || 6,315 || || 1
|-
| bgcolor="" |
| align="left" | Democratic Modernist Pole || 5,795 || || 1
|- style="background:#E9E9E9;"
! colspan="2" align="left" | Valid votes !! - !! - !! 9
|- style="background:#E9E9E9;"
| colspan="2" align="left" | Blank or invalid votes || - || -
| rowspan="4" |
|- style="background:#E9E9E9;"
! colspan="2" align="left" | Total !! - !! 100.00
|- style="background:#E9E9E9;"
| colspan="2" align="left" | Voter turnout
| colspan="2" | -
|- style="background:#E9E9E9;"
| colspan="2" align="left" | Electorate
| colspan="2" | -
|-
| colspan="5" | Source:
|}

|- style="background:#E9E9E9;"
! colspan="2" align="left" | Parties
! Votes
! %
! Seats
|-
| bgcolor="" |
| align="left" | Ennahda Movement || 66,402 || - || 3
|-
| bgcolor="" |
| align="left" | Congress for the Republic || 14,302 || - || 1
|-
| bgcolor="" |
| align="left" | Popular Petition || 11,840 || - || 1
|-
| bgcolor="" |
| align="left" | Democratic Forum for Labour and Liberties || 6,884 || - || 1
|-
| bgcolor="" |
| align="left" | PCOT || 5,306 || - || 1
|-
| bgcolor="gainsboro" |
| align="left" | Independent lists || - || - || -
|- style="background:#E9E9E9;"
! colspan="2" align="left" | Valid votes !! - !! - !! 7
|- style="background:#E9E9E9;"
| colspan="2" align="left" | Blank or invalid votes || - || -
| rowspan="4" |
|- style="background:#E9E9E9;"
! colspan="2" align="left" | Total !! - !! 100.00
|- style="background:#E9E9E9;"
| colspan="2" align="left" | Voter turnout
| colspan="2" | -
|- style="background:#E9E9E9;"
| colspan="2" align="left" | Electorate
| colspan="2" | -
|-
| colspan="5" | Source:
|}

|- style="background:#E9E9E9;"
! colspan="2" align="left" | Parties
! Votes
! %
! Seats
|-
| bgcolor="" |
| align="left" | Ennahda Movement || 81,816 || - || 4
|-
| bgcolor="" |
| align="left" | Congress for the Republic || 28,126 || - || 1
|-
| bgcolor="" |
| align="left" | Popular Petition || 18,664 || || 1
|-
| bgcolor="gainsboro" |
| align="left" | Future Voice (independent) || 13,432 || - || 1
|-
| bgcolor="" |
| align="left" | Democratic Forum for Labour and Liberties || 13,032 || || 1
|-
| bgcolor="" |
| align="left" | Afek Tounes || 5,304 || || 1
|- style="background:#E9E9E9;"
! colspan="2" align="left" | Valid votes !! - !! - !! 9
|- style="background:#E9E9E9;"
| colspan="2" align="left" | Blank or invalid votes || - || -
| rowspan="4" |
|- style="background:#E9E9E9;"
! colspan="2" align="left" | Total !! - !! 100.00
|- style="background:#E9E9E9;"
| colspan="2" align="left" | Voter turnout
| colspan="2" | -
|- style="background:#E9E9E9;"
| colspan="2" align="left" | Electorate
| colspan="2" | -
|-
| colspan="5" | Source:
|}

Tunisians Abroad

|- style="background:#E9E9E9;"
! colspan="2" align="left" | Parties
! Votes
! %
! Seats
|-
| bgcolor="" |
| align="left" | Ennahda Movement || 22,672 || 33.52 || 2
|-
| bgcolor="" |
| align="left" | Congress for the Republic || 8,445 || 12.49 || 1
|-
| bgcolor="" |
| align="left" | Democratic Forum for Labour and Liberties || 7,571 || 11.19 || 1
|-
| bgcolor="" |
| align="left" | Democratic Modernist Pole || 5,555 || 8.21 || 1
|-
| bgcolor="gainsboro" |
| align="left" | Independent lists || - || - || -
|- style="background:#E9E9E9;"
! colspan="2" align="left" | Valid votes !! - !! - !! 5
|- style="background:#E9E9E9;"
| colspan="2" align="left" | Blank or invalid votes || - || -
| rowspan="4" |
|- style="background:#E9E9E9;"
! colspan="2" align="left" | Total !! 67,640 !! 100.00
|- style="background:#E9E9E9;"
| colspan="2" align="left" | Voter turnout
| colspan="2" | -
|- style="background:#E9E9E9;"
| colspan="2" align="left" | Electorate
| colspan="2" | -
|-
| colspan="5" | Source:
|}

|- style="background:#E9E9E9;"
! colspan="2" align="left" | Parties
! Votes
! %
! Seats
|-
| bgcolor="" |
| align="left" | Ennahda Movement || 17,103 || 33.99 || 2
|-
| bgcolor="" |
| align="left" | Congress for the Republic || 5,006 || 9.95 || 1
|-
| bgcolor="" |
| align="left" | Democratic Forum for Labour and Liberties || 4,148 || 8.24 || 1
|-
| bgcolor="" |
| align="left" | Popular Petition (disqualified)|| - || - || 1
|-
|bgcolor="" |
| align="left" | Progressive Democratic Party || 4,022 || 7.99 || +1
|-
| bgcolor="gainsboro" |
| align="left" | Independent lists || - || - || -
|- style="background:#E9E9E9;"
! colspan="2" align="left" | Valid votes !! - !! - !! 5
|- style="background:#E9E9E9;"
| colspan="2" align="left" | Blank or invalid votes || - || -
| rowspan="4" |
|- style="background:#E9E9E9;"
! colspan="2" align="left" | Total !! 50,314 !! 100.00
|- style="background:#E9E9E9;"
| colspan="2" align="left" | Voter turnout
| colspan="2" | -
|- style="background:#E9E9E9;"
| colspan="2" align="left" | Electorate
| colspan="2" | -
|-
| colspan="5" | Source:
|}

|- style="background:#E9E9E9;"
! colspan="2" align="left" | Parties
! Votes
! %
! Seats
|-
| bgcolor="" |
| align="left" | Ennahda Movement || 5,707 || 42.77 || 1
|-
| bgcolor="" |
| align="left" | Congress for the Republic || 2,288 || 17.15 || -
|-
| bgcolor="" |
| align="left" | Democratic Forum for Labour and Liberties || 1,788 || 13.40 || -
|-
| bgcolor="" |
| align="left" | Popular Petition || 1,088 || 8.15 ||-
|-
| bgcolor="" |
| align="left" | Democratic Modernist Pole || 923 || 6.92 || -
|-
| bgcolor="white" |
| align="left" | People's Movement || 129 || 0.97 || -
|-
| bgcolor="white" |

| align="left" | Popular Republican Union || 94 || 0.70 || - 
|-
| bgcolor="gainsboro" |
| align="left" | Independent lists || 962 || 7.21 || -
|- style="background:#E9E9E9;"
! colspan="2" align="left" | Valid votes !! 13,289 !! 99.60 !! 1
|- style="background:#E9E9E9;"
| colspan="2" align="left" | Blank or invalid votes || 53 || 0.40
| rowspan="4" |
|- style="background:#E9E9E9;"
! colspan="2" align="left" | Total !! 13,342 !! 100.00
|- style="background:#E9E9E9;"
| colspan="2" align="left" | Voter turnout
| colspan="2" | -
|- style="background:#E9E9E9;"
| colspan="2" align="left" | Electorate
| colspan="2" | -
|-
| colspan="5" | Source: IRIE Germany
|}

|- style="background:#E9E9E9;"
! colspan="2" align="left" | Parties
! Votes
! %
! Seats
|-
| bgcolor="" |
| align="left" | Ennahda Movement || 11,627 || 49.00 || 2
|-
| bgcolor="" |
| align="left" | Popular Petition || 2,683 || 11.31 || 1
|-
| bgcolor="gainsboro" |
| align="left" | Independent lists || - || - || -
|- style="background:#E9E9E9;"
! colspan="2" align="left" | Valid votes !! - !! - !! 3
|- style="background:#E9E9E9;"
| colspan="2" align="left" | Blank or invalid votes || - || -
| rowspan="4" |
|- style="background:#E9E9E9;"
! colspan="2" align="left" | Total !! 23,728 !! 100.00
|- style="background:#E9E9E9;"
| colspan="2" align="left" | Voter turnout
| colspan="2" | -
|- style="background:#E9E9E9;"
| colspan="2" align="left" | Electorate
| colspan="2" | -
|-
| colspan="5" | Source:
|}

|- style="background:#E9E9E9;"
! colspan="2" align="left" | Parties
! Votes
! %
! Seats
|-
| bgcolor="" |
| align="left" | Ennahda Movement || 10,218 || 35.0 || 1
|-
| bgcolor="" |
| align="left" | Congress for the Republic || 5,411 || 18.5 || 1
|-
| bgcolor="" |
| align="left" | Democratic Forum for Labour and Liberties || 4,780 || 16.4 || -
|-
| bgcolor="" |
| align="left" | Progressive Democratic Party || 2,730 || 9.4 || -
|-
| bgcolor="" |
| align="left" | Democratic Modernist Pole || 2,565 || 8.8 || -
|-
| bgcolor="" |
| align="left" | Afek Tounes || 695 || 2.4 || -
|-
| bgcolor="" |
| align="left" | Popular Petition || 522 || 1.8 || -
|-
| bgcolor="gainsboro" |
| align="left" | Independent lists || 2,259 || 7.7 || -
|- style="background:#E9E9E9;"
! colspan="2" align="left" | Valid votes !! 29,180 !! 95.4 !! 2
|- style="background:#E9E9E9;"
| colspan="2" align="left" | Invalid votes || 1,273 || 4.1
| rowspan="3" |
|- style="background:#E9E9E9;"
| colspan="2" align="left" | Blank votes || 299 || 1.0
|- style="background:#E9E9E9;"
! colspan="2" align="left" | Total !! 30,752 !! 100.0
|-
| colspan="5" | Source: ISIE
|}

|- style="background:#E9E9E9;"
! colspan="2" align="left" | Parties
! Votes
! %
! Seats
|-
| bgcolor="" |
| align="left" | Ennahda Movement || 8,704 || 45.8 || 1
|-
| bgcolor="" |
| align="left" | Congress for the Republic || 2,760 || 14.5 || 1
|-
| bgcolor="" |
| align="left" | Democratic Forum for Labour and Liberties || 2,142 || 11.3 || -
|-
| bgcolor="" |
| align="left" | Progressive Democratic Party || 1,386 || 7.3 || -
|-
| bgcolor="" |
| align="left" | Democratic Modernist Pole || 1,112 || 5.9 || -
|-
| bgcolor="" |
| align="left" | Popular Petition || 635 || 3.3 || -
|-
| bgcolor="" |
| align="left" | Afek Tounes || 412 || 2.2 || -
|-
| bgcolor="gainsboro" |
| align="left" | Other parties and independent lists || 1,854 || 9.8 || -
|- style="background:#E9E9E9;"
! colspan="2" align="left" | Valid votes !! 19,005 !! 94.9 !! 2
|- style="background:#E9E9E9;"
| colspan="2" align="left" | Invalid votes || 800 || 4.0
| rowspan="3" |
|- style="background:#E9E9E9;"
| colspan="2" align="left" | Blank votes || 226 || 1.1
|- style="background:#E9E9E9;"
! colspan="2" align="left" | Total !! 20,031 !! 100.0
|-
| colspan="5" | Source: ISIE
|}

Seats distribution by constituency

Cap Bon

|- style="background:#E9E9E9;" align="left"
! Member
! colspan="2" | Party
|- align="left"
| Member 1
| bgcolor="" |
| Ennahda
|- align="left"
| Member 2
| bgcolor="" |
| Ennahda
|- align="left"
| Member 3
| bgcolor="" |
| CPR
|- align="left"
| Member 4
| bgcolor="" |
| Ettakatol
|- align="left"
| Member 5
| bgcolor="" |
| Popular Petition
|- align="left"
| Member 6
| bgcolor="" |
| PDP
|- align="left"
| Member 7
| bgcolor="" |
| Afek
|-
| colspan="3" | Source:
|}

|- style="background:#E9E9E9;" align="left"
! Member
! colspan="2" | Party
|- align="left"
| Member 1
| bgcolor="" |
| Ennahda
|- align="left"
| Member 2
| bgcolor="" |
| Ennahda
|- align="left"
| Member 3
| bgcolor="" |
| CPR
|- align="left"
| Member 4
| bgcolor="" |
| Ettakatol
|- align="left"
| Member 5
| bgcolor="" |
| Popular Petition
|- align="left"
| Member 6
| bgcolor="" |
| PDP
|-
| colspan="3" | Source:
|}

Tunisians Abroad

|- style="background:#E9E9E9;" align="left"
! Member
! colspan="2" | Party
|- align="left"
| Amer Laaraiedh
| bgcolor="" |
| Ennahda
|- align="left"
| Mehrzia Laabidi
| bgcolor="" |
| Ennahda
|- align="left"
| Imed Daimi
| bgcolor="" |
| CPR
|- align="left"
| Slim Ben Abdesslem
| bgcolor="" |
| Ettakatol
|- align="left"
| Nadia Chaabane
| bgcolor="" |
| PDM
|-
| colspan="3" | Source: Tunisie-Etudes.info
|}

|- style="background:#E9E9E9;" align="left"
! Member
! colspan="2" | Party
|- align="left"
| Néji Jmal
| bgcolor="" |
| Ennahda
|- align="left"
| Dalila Babba
| bgcolor="" |
| Ennahda
|- align="left"
| Hedi Ben Abbas
| bgcolor="" |
| CPR
|- align="left"
| Karima Souid
| bgcolor="" |
| Ettakatol
|- align="left"
| Mohamed Elmay
| bgcolor="" |
| PDP
|-
| colspan="3" | Source: Tunisie-Etudes.info
|}

|- style="background:#E9E9E9;" align="left"
! Member
! colspan="2" | Party
|- align="left"
| Fathi Ayadi
| bgcolor="" |
| Ennahda
|-
| colspan="3" | Source: Tunisie-Etudes.info
|}

|- style="background:#E9E9E9;" align="left"
! Member
! colspan="2" | Party
|- align="left"
| Oussama Essghaier
| bgcolor="" |
| Ennahda
|- align="left"
| Imen Ben Ahmed
| bgcolor="" |
| Ennahda
|- align="left"
| Abdessatar Dhifi
| bgcolor="" |
| Popular Petition
|-
| colspan="3" | Source: Tunisie-Etudes.info
|}

|- style="background:#E9E9E9;" align="left"
! Member
! colspan="2" | Party
|- align="left"
| Mohamed Zrig
| bgcolor="" |
| Ennahda
|- align="left"
| Mabrouka Mbarek
| bgcolor="" |
| CPR
|-
| colspan="3" | Source: Tunisie-Etudes.info
|}

|- style="background:#E9E9E9;" align="left"
! Member
! colspan="2" | Party
|- align="left"
| Kamel Ben Amara
| bgcolor="" |
| Ennahda
|- align="left"
| Ikbel Msadaa
| bgcolor="" |
| CPR
|-
| colspan="3" | Source: Tunisie-Etudes.info
|}

External links
Election commission (ISIE) (Arabic and French)
Results per constituencies (Arabic only)
 Very detailed and complete results, from whole constituencies down to individual voting stations (Arabic only)

Election results in Tunisia
2011 elections in Africa
2011 in Tunisia